Jannatabad (also Romanized as Jannatābād) is a village in Tabas Rural District, in the Central District of Khoshab County, Razavi Khorasan Province, Iran. At the 2006 census, its population was 381, in 107 families.

References 

Populated places in Khoshab County